Club Atlético San Cristóbal, commonly known as Atlético San Cristóbal, is a Dominican Republic professional football club which competes in the Liga Dominicana de Fútbol. It is also known as AirEuropa San Cristóbal for sponsorship reasons. The club is based in San Cristóbal. The club was established in 2015 after the Dominican Football Federation announced the creation of a professional league, the Liga Dominicana de Fútbol.

Players

Current roster 2021–22

References

External links
Atlético San Cristóbal on FIFA
Atlético San Cristóbal on LDF

Football clubs in the Dominican Republic
Association football clubs established in 2015
2015 establishments in the Dominican Republic